Andrė Lukošiūtė (born 23 June 2001) is a Lithuanian tennis player.

Lukošiūtė has a career-high singles ranking by the Women's Tennis Association (WTA) of 749, achieved on 16 January 2023. She also has a career high doubles ranking by WTA of 399, achieved on 30 January 2023. She has won two doubles titles on the ITF Circuit. 

Lukošiūtė competes for Lithuania in the Billie Jean King Cup, where she has a win-loss record of 4–0.

Personal life
Lukosiute was born in Kaunas and began playing tennis at the age of 6. Her favourite players growing up were Maria Sharapova and Rafael Nadal. She resides in the United Kingdom and has previously represented Essex at county tennis, starting at U14 level.

Career

Junior
Lukosiute entered several tournaments on the ITF Junior Circuit in 2016 and 2017 but did not play regularly and reached a highest ranking of 876. She was the winner of the Grade 5 Preveza Cup in Greece in July 2016. In Tennis Europe junior tour events, Lukosiute won the Nike Junior International held in Edinburgh in 2015, defeating Amarni Banks in the final; and later that year was runner-up to Emma Raducanu in the Nike Junior International at the National Tennis Centre in London.

Senior
Lukosiute made her professional debut in December 2018 at an ITF event in Monastir, Tunisia but played only sporadically on the ITF tour until 2021. She won two doubles titles during the 2022 ITF season with Eliz Maloney, which saw her crack the top 500 in the doubles rankings.

ITF Circuit finals

Singles: 1 (runner-up)

Doubles: 4 (2 titles, 2 runner-ups)

References

External links
 
 
 

2001 births
Living people
Lithuanian female tennis players
Lithuanian emigrants to the United Kingdom
People from Kaunas